The papillate catfish (Neoarius velutinus) is a species of catfish in the family Ariidae. It was described by Max Carl Wilhelm Weber in 1907, originally under the genus Hemipimelodus. It inhabits freshwater lakes and rivers in New Guinea. Its diet includes mayflies and other terrestrial and aquatic insects, detritus, benthic algae, and crustaceans.

It spawns throughout the year. It is harvested by subsistence fisheries.

References

Ariidae
Fish described in 1907